Paiting! or Hwaiting! is a Korean word of support or encouragement. It is frequently used in sports or whenever a challenge such as a difficult test or unpleasant assignment is met. It derives from a Konglish borrowing of the English word "Fighting!"

In English, "fighting" is a verb (specifically, a present participle) whereas cheers and exclamations of support usually take the form of imperative verbs. Paiting!’s Japanese equivalent, for example, is the more grammatically standard Faito!. For that reason, paiting! is often translated in English as "Come on!" or "Let's go!" Daehan Minguk Paiting! might be glossed as "Go, Korea!" English does sometimes use adjectives and nouns as words of support ("Good!" "Good job!") but the original meaning of fighting simply implies some conflict exists; it doesn't imply either side will be victorious and offers no support. Within Korean, paiting! serves as an encouragement to release one's inhibitions and draw on inner power.

Paiting! is often accompanied by the expression Aja aja!, which has a similar meaning. The pronunciation Hwaiting, despite often being used colloquially, is not included in important Korean dictionaries such as Standard Korean Language Dictionary.

Related terms
In addition to Faito!, terms used similarly in East Asia are the Chinese Jiayou! ( "add oil!") and Japanese Ganbatte!. The growing importance of Korean pop culture means that "Fighting!" is now sometimes used in Chinese-to-English and Japanese-to-English translations as well to convey these native phrases.

References

South Korean popular culture
Korean words and phrases
Chants